There were some special elections to the United States House of Representatives in 1995, during the 104th United States Congress.

List of elections 

Elections are listed by date and district.

|-
| 
| Norman Mineta
|  | Democratic
| 1992
|  | Incumbent resigned October 10, 1995 to accept a position with Lockheed Martin.New member elected December 12, 1995.Republican gain.
| nowrap | 
|-
| 
| Mel Reynolds
|  | Democratic
| 1992
|  | Incumbent resigned October 1, 1995.New member elected December 12, 1995.Democratic hold.
| nowrap | 
|}

 
1993